Balesmes-sur-Marne is a former commune in the Haute-Marne department in the Champagne-Ardenne region in northeastern France. On 1 January 2016, it was merged into the commune Saints-Geosmes.

Population

See also
Communes of the Haute-Marne department

References

Former communes of Haute-Marne